Acontia detrita is a moth of the family Noctuidae. It is found in New South Wales and Queensland.

The wingspan is about 15 mm. Adults have brown wings. The basal half of each forewing is variable patchy pale brown and the marginal half is dark brown. The hindwings are brown, fading somewhat toward the bases.

External links

Australian Faunal Directory
Australian Insects

Moths of Australia
detrita
Moths of Queensland
Moths described in 1886